Heonjong of Joseon (8 September 1827 – 25 July 1849) was the 24th king of the Joseon Dynasty of Korea. He was the grandson of Sunjo. His father was Crown Prince Hyomyeong (posthumously named Munjo of Joseon), who died at the age of 20 before becoming king, and his mother was Queen Sinjeong of the Pungyang Jo clan. Heonjong was born three years before Hyomyeong's death.

Biography
Yi Hwan was born to Crown Princess Jo and Crown Prince Hyomyeong on 8 September 1827 in Gyeongchunjeon (경춘전, 景春殿) within Changdeok Palace. It was said that when the day before he was born, she dreamt of giving her son a box containing a tree carved with jade, and on the day of his birth, a group of cranes flew from the front room and went around for a long time. She and the others considered it to be strange. The young Heonjong ascended to the throne in 1834 at the age of 7 after his grandfather, King Sunjo, died. Like King Sunjo, Heonjong took the throne at a young age and his grandmother, Queen Sunwon served as queen regent. Although King Heonjong ascended to the throne, he had no political control over Joseon. When Heonjong reached adulthood, Queen Sunwon refused to give up control. In 1840, the control over the kingdom was then handed down to the Andong Kim clan, the family of his grandmother Queen Sunwon, following the anti-Catholic Gihae persecution of 1839.

King Heonjong died after reigning for 15 years in 1849 at the age of 21. He was buried at the Gyeongneung tomb within the Donggureung Tomb Cluster in Seoul, where several kings and queens of the Joseon Dynasty were buried, with Queen Hyohyeon and Queen Hyojeong. As King Heonjong died without an heir, the throne passed to a distant descendant of King Yeongjo, King Cheoljong.

As was customary with the Annals of the Joseon Dynasty, the chronicle of Heonjong's reign was compiled after his death, in 1851. The compilation of the 16-volume chronicle was supervised by Jo In-yeong, her mother's uncle.

Family
 Great-Great-Great-Great-Grandfather
 King Sukjong of Joseon (조선 숙종) (7 October 1661 – 12 July 1720)
 Great-Great-Great-Great-Grandmother
 Royal Noble Consort Sukbin of the Haeju Choi clan (숙빈 최씨) (17 December 1670 – 9 April 1718)
 Great-Great-Great-Grandfather
 King Yeongjo of Joseon (조선 영조) (31 October 1694 – 22 April 1776)
 Great-Great-Great-Grandmother
 Royal Noble Consort Yeongbin of the Jeonui Lee clan (영빈 이씨) (15 August 1696 – 23 August 1764)
 Great-Great-Grandfather
 Crown Prince Sado (사도세자) (13 February 1735 - 12 July 1762)
 Great-Great-Grandmother
 Lady Hyegyeong of the Pungsan Hong clan (헌경의황후 홍씨) (6 August 1735 - 13 January 1816)
 Great-Grandfather
 King Jeongjo of Joseon (정조) (28 October 1752 - 18 August 1800)
 Great-Grandmother
 Royal Noble Consort Subin of the Bannam Park clan (수빈 박씨) (1770 - 5 February 1823)
 Adoptive Great-Grandmother: Queen Hyoui of the Cheongpung Kim clan (5 January 1754 - 10 April 1821)
 Grandfather
 King Sunjo of Joseon (29 July 1790 – 13 December 1834)
 Grandmother
 Queen Sunwon of the Andong Kim clan (8 June 1789 – 21 September 1857)
 Father
 King Munjo of Joseon (18 September 1809 – 25 June 1830)
 Mother
 Queen Sinjeong of the Pungyang Jo clan (21 January 1809 – 4 June 1890)
 Maternal Grandfather: Jo Man-yeong (1776 – 1846)
 Maternal Grandmother: Lady Deokan of the Eunjin Song clan (1776 – 1834) (덕안부부인 은진 송씨)
 Consorts and their Respective Issue(s): 
Queen Hyohyeon of the Andong Kim clan (27 April 1828 – 18 October 1843)
Queen Hyojeong of the Namyang Hong clan (6 March 1831 – 2 January 1904)
Royal Noble Consort Gyeongbin of the Gwangsan Kim clan (27 August 1832 – 21 April 1907)
Royal Noble Consort Jeongbin of the Haepyeong Yun clan (1833 - ?)
Royal Consort Suk-ui of the Gimhae Kim clan (January 1814 – 12 November 1895)
Unnamed daughter (1848 - 1848); died prematurely

In popular culture
 Portrayed by Jung Hae-in in the 2018 film Heung-boo: The Revolutionist.

Full posthumous name
 King  the Great of Joseon

Ancestry

See also
List of Rulers of Korea
Joseon Dynasty
History of Korea

References

House of Yi
1827 births
1849 deaths
19th-century Korean monarchs